The name Molave has been used to name three tropical cyclones in the Western Pacific Ocean. The name is a Spanish corruption of mulawin, referring to the Vitex parviflora, a species of hard wood used in furniture. The name Molave replaced Imbudo after it caused extensive damage both over the Philippines and China.

 Typhoon Molave (2009) (T0906, 07W, Isang) 
 Tropical Storm Molave (2015) (T1514, 15W)
 Typhoon Molave (2020) (T2018, 21W, Quinta) - a powerful typhoon that devastated the Southern Luzon area of the Philippines and Vietnam.

The name Molave was retired from use in the Western Pacific following the 2020 typhoon season and was replaced with Narra, which refers to the pantropical genus Pterocarpus of trees in the family Fabaceae, but especially Pterocarpus indicus.

References

Pacific typhoon set index articles